Pelesit is a type of familiar spirit in Malay folklore. It is generally a cricket, or occasionally a grasshopper. The term literally means "buzzer" from the root word lesit meaning to buzz or whizz, as an insect does. They are also called Palasik.

Belief in the pelesit traces back to Malay animism before the introduction of monotheism. Generally speaking, a pelesit can only be owned by a woman, and were said to have been prevalent in Kedah. The male equivalent is another hereditary spirit, the bajang. Due to the similarity, the two are sometimes confused in folklore.

Two rituals exist for acquiring a pelesit, both of which involve recitation of the correct incantations and biting off the tongue of a dead child. This tongue, if kept properly with the appropriate rituals, is what becomes the pelesit.

Pelesit attack their victims by entering the person's mouth tail-first. A person afflicted by the pelesit will insanely rave about cats. By itself, the pelesit does nothing else. However, it is often the pet of another familiar spirit, the polong. If a pelesit enters a person's body and chirps, it is calling for the polong, which can make the victim go insane or unconscious. A shaman (bomoh or dukun) cures the victim by using a specific incantation and then asking them to reveal their "mother", meaning the pelesit's owner. The victim replies in a high-pitched voice, after which the shaman attempts to make the owner recall it.

When the pelesit is not in use, its owner keeps it in a bottle and regularly feeds it either with turmeric rice or blood pricked from the ring finger (known in Malay as the "ghost finger"). If the owner wishes to dispose of the pelesit, the bottle is buried.

In literature and popular culture

The pelesit is one of many ghosts and spirits mentioned by Munshi Abdullah in his book Hikayat Abdullah, to the amusement of his employer Stamford Raffles.

In Kijiya, a Malaysian komku series, the Pelesit are demonic creatures that serve as the series' main antagonists

See also 
Hantu Raya
Polong
Toyol

References

External links 
 Vampires: A Field Guide to the Creatures That Stalk the Night, By Bob Curran, Published by Career Press, 2005, 222 pages - Google books.

Malay ghost myth
Malaysian mythology
Animism in Asia
Malay words and phrases
Jinn
Asian shamanism